Hassel Sound is an uninhabited natural waterway in the Qikiqtaaluk Region, Nunavut, Canada. It separates Ellef Ringnes Island to the west from Amund Ringnes Island to the east.

Sounds of Qikiqtaaluk Region